Polyporus leprieurii is a species of poroid fungus in the genus Polyporus. It was first described scientifically by French mycologist Camille Montagne.

It is found in tropical to subtropical areas of America and Eastern Asia, where it grows on dead hardwood that is lying on the ground, or on hanging branches.

References

Fungi described in 1840
Fungi of Asia
Fungi of South America
leprieurii
Taxa named by Camille Montagne